The 1977–78 Algerian Cup is the 16th edition of the Algerian Cup. JS Kawkabi are the defending champions, having beaten NA Hussein Dey 2–1 in the previous season's final.

Round of 64

Round of 32

Round of 16

Quarter-finals

Semi-finals

Final

Match

References

Algerian Cup
Algerian Cup
Algerian Cup